Manolov Glacier is the 3 km long in east-northeast to west-southwest direction and 1.3 km wide glacier on the west side of Havre Mountains in northern Alexander Island, Antarctica. It is situated south of Oselna Glacier and west of Coulter Glacier, flows southwestwards and enters Lazarev Bay northwest of Goleminov Point.

The feature is named after the Bulgarian composer Emanuil Manolov (1860-1902).

Location
British mapping in 1971.

Maps
 British Antarctic Territory. Scale 1:200000 topographic map. DOS 610 – W 69 70. Tolworth, UK, 1971
 Antarctic Digital Database (ADD). Scale 1:250000 topographic map of Antarctica. Scientific Committee on Antarctic Research (SCAR). Since 1993, regularly upgraded and updated

References
 Bulgarian Antarctic Gazetteer. Antarctic Place-names Commission. (details in Bulgarian, basic data in English)
 Manolov Glacier. SCAR Composite Gazetteer of Antarctica

External links
 Manolov Glacier. Copernix satellite image

Glaciers of Alexander Island
Bulgaria and the Antarctic